Michel Antoine Michel Auréglia (16 May 1912 – 18 October 1978) was a Monegasque sailor. He competed in the Star event at the 1952 Summer Olympics.

References

External links
 

1912 births
1978 deaths
Monegasque male sailors (sport)
Olympic sailors of Monaco
Sailors at the 1952 Summer Olympics – Star